Helen Estabrook is an American TV/film producer and executive known for producing the film Whiplash (2014), which earned her a nomination for Academy Award for Best Picture at the 87th ceremony. She is Head of Global Film and Television at Condé Nast Entertainment (CNE). Previously, she ran her own company, A Thousand Ships, and had 2-year first-look TV development deals with Hulu from September 2016 to 2018, and HBO from October 2018 to 2020. Estabrook started her work in television with Hulu's Golden Globe-nominated series Casual, developed The Front Runner (2018), Up In The Air, Jeff, Who Lives at Home, Demolition, Young Adult, and Tully.  Her last independent series before moving to a studio position was as executive producer of the limited series Mrs. Fletcher for HBO. Her position with CNE was announced March 2021.

Biography 
Estabrook grew up in Champaign, Illinois. She attended University Laboratory High School after 6th grade. At the age of 16, she attended Harvard College where she studied sociology, graduating in 2003. As an undergraduate, Estabrook took film courses before entering the field of film production. She worked in New York City as a production assistant and as an agency assistant before moving to Los Angeles.

References

External links 

Living people
American women film producers
Harvard College alumni
Year of birth missing (living people)
American women television producers
21st-century American women